Club de Fútbol Torre Levante Orriols is a Spanish football team based in Valencia, in the Valencian Community. Founded in 1976, it plays in Primera Regional, the 7th level of Spanish football, holding home games at Campo Municipal de Orriols, which has a capacity of 2,000 spectators.

Season to season

6 seasons in Tercera División

References

External links
Official website 
La Preferente team profile 

Football clubs in the Valencian Community
Association football clubs established in 1976
1976 establishments in Spain